The Marshall Thundering Herd baseball team represents the Marshall University in NCAA Division I college baseball and competes in the Sun Belt Conference. The current head coach of the Herd is Greg Beals. Marshall currently plays their conference home games off-campus in Charleston, West Virginia at Appalachian Power Park.

Home venues
Kennedy Center Field 
Appalachian Power Park (select games)

History
Marshall baseball was a winning program right from the start. The Herd won the West Virginia Intercollegiate Athletic Conference (which Marshall helped to found in 1924 as what would be known as the WVIAC) in 1928-29-30-3 under former Ohio State University and St. Louis Cardinals pitcher Johnny "Stud" Stuart, then won the Buckeye Conference 1933-34-35 under Marshall and West Virginia University Halls of Fame member Roy "Legs" Hawley. 

It would be until 1978 before the Herd won another league title, winning the Southern Conference in its second year in the league and again in 1981. Marshall advanced to the NCAA Tournament in 1973 as an independent and 1978 as the SoCon champ, all under legendary baseball Head Coach Jack Cook. Marshall finished as runner-up in the 2008 C-USA Baseball Tournament, falling in the finals to Houston, 3–2, but winning a MU record 30 games without a home field to use in Huntington for the entire season. For the first time since 1994, MU had players drafted in the June 5–6 Major League Baseball Draft with a school-record three being selected, plus one recruit in 2008. Steve Blevins, who tied the single-season wins mark with a 9–3 mark, signed with the Minnesota Twins on June 11, while Nate Lape was drafted by the Colorado Rockies and Tommy Johnson by the Seattle Mariners. Lape and second baseman Adam Yeager played in the Cape Cod League, the premier wooden bat summer college baseball league, for the Brewster Whitecaps. In 2015, outfielder Corey Bird was an All-Cape Cod League selection, then hit .300 for the 2016 Herd and led C-USA in stolen bases. In 2016, Marshall finished second in C-USA by 1/2 game behind Florida Atlantic, and the Herd advanced to the semi-finals of the C-USA Tournament, losing to eventual champ Southern Miss on the Golden Eagles home stadium, 3–2, in the semis and finishing 2–2 in the tourney. The Herd won a Marshall record 34 games (and lost only 21), posted the first winning season since 1994 and made the C-USA Tournament for the first time since 2010. Marshall was 13–2 in the final five series of the year in the league games and swept three in a row on the way to winning eight C-USA series, also an all-time high. Senior Chase Boster became Marshall's biggest winning when he passed both Albie DeYoung and Grant Harper with his 20th win of his career, finishing 8–3 on the season.

Marshall has an all-time record of 1,363–1,532–12 (at end of 2016 season, 110 seasons all-time since 1896).

Unlike most Division I baseball programs, Marshall did not have a full-time home stadium. Due to Conference USA standards, it played non-conference games at Kennedy Center Field, a community baseball field just outside Huntington. Due to its limited amenities for both fans and players, Marshall has played conference games at Appalachian Power Park in Charleston, more than 50 miles from campus. Select games were also played at Linda K. Epling Stadium in Beckley, 110 miles from campus.  Upgrades to the Kennedy Center Field allowed Marshall to play all its games at beginning in 2019, with the exception of games versus rivals WVU and Virginia Tech, which draw a larger crowd than the Kennedy Center can accommodate and will continue to be played in Charleston.

In 2018, the school purchased land near its existing campus for a new ballpark. Construction began in 2019, with completion originally planned for the 2021 season. The opening has since been delayed to the 2022 season due to COVID-19.

Former players

Marshall has sent 16 players to the major leagues and has had 33 Major League Baseball draft selections since the draft began in 1965.

Herd in Major League Baseball
 Jimmy Adair – Chicago Cubs
 Aaron Blair – Atlanta Braves
 Wilbur Fisher – Pittsburgh Pirates
 Johnson Fry – Cleveland Indians
 Joe Goddard – San Diego Padres
 J. D. Hammer – Philadelphia Phillies
 Jack Harper – Philadelphia Athletics
 Jeff Montgomery – Cincinnati Reds, Kansas City Royals
 Rick Reed – Pittsburgh Pirates, Kansas City Royals, Texas Rangers, Cincinnati Reds, New York Mets, Minnesota Twins
 Kevin Shackelford – Cincinnati Reds
 Arch Reilly – Pittsburgh Pirates
 Brandyn Sittinger – Arizona Diamondbacks
 Dan Straily – Oakland Athletics, Chicago Cubs, Houston Astros, Cincinnati Reds, Miami Marlins, Baltimore Orioles
 Johnny Watson – Detroit Tigers
 Bill Wilson – Philadelphia Phillies

Herd in Other Fields
Billy Crystal - Academy-Award winning actor and comedian Billy Crystal attended Marshall on a baseball scholarship. Crystal never played baseball at Marshall because the program was suspended during his first year, 1965.  He did not return to Marshall as a sophomore,

See also
List of NCAA Division I baseball programs

References

 
Baseball teams established in 1896
1896 establishments in West Virginia